Bence Nagy (born 5 July 1995) is a Hungarian handball player for Ferencvárosi TC and the Hungarian national team.

Honours

Club
Grundfos Tatabánya KC
Nemzeti Bajnokság I
: 2019''

Individual
 Nemzeti Bajnokság I Top Scorer: 2016, 2022

References

External links

Kéziszövetség

Hungarian male handball players
Living people
1995 births
Handball players from Budapest